Daniel Budnik (May 20, 1933 – August 14, 2020) was an American photographer noted for his portraits of artists and photographs of the Civil Rights Movement and Native American life.

Career
Budnik studied painting at the Art Students League of New York in the early 1950s under Charles Alston, who he credited for inspiring his interest in photojournalism. He was drafted into the Army and served until he was 22. After working as an assistant to Philippe Halsman, he joined Magnum Photos in 1957, where his first assignment was photographing atrocities in Cuba in 1958. "As long as you didn't sleep in the same bed two nights running you were relatively safe. Batista was killing about seven people a night in interrogation. You'd wake up in the morning and there would be a body hanging in a tree as a warning not to get involved." He eventually photographed material for Life, Sports Illustrated, and Vogue magazines.

He was one of the photographers to capture the March on Washington in 1963. Later, Budnik convinced Life to commission him to create a long-term photo essay showing the seriousness of the 1965 Selma to Montgomery march, during which he photographed both Martin Luther King Jr. and George Wallace. However, Life declined to publish his work after devoting two consecutive issues to covering the march using other photographers.

Since 1970, Budnik has worked with the Hopi and Navajo Native American tribes, for which he was awarded grants from the National Endowment for the Arts (1973) and the Polaroid Foundation (1980).

During his career, Budnik has photographed Candice Bergen, Sophia Loren, Martin Luther King Jr., Georgia O'Keeffe, Willem de Kooning, and Dwight D. Eisenhower. The American Society of Media Photographers awarded Budnik its 1998 Honor Roll Award.

Budnik has work in the collections of the King Center for Nonviolent Social Change in Atlanta, Georgia, and the Museum of Modern Art. Budnik also exhibited his work at the Agnes gallery.

Personal life
Budnik lived and worked in Tucson, Arizona. Budnik died on August 14, 2020, at an assisted living facility in Tucson.

Works 
The Book of Elders: The Life Stories of Great American Indians, as told to Sandy Johnson, photographed by Dan Budnik. San Francisco: Harper San Francisco, 1994.

See also
 List of photographers of the civil rights movement

References

External links
 
 

1933 births
2020 deaths
American portrait photographers
American photojournalists
Artists from Tucson, Arizona
Artists from New York (state)